Nam Viyaketh (born 5 June 1958) is a Laotian statesman and member of the Lao People's Revolutionary Party. As of 2010, he was Minister of Industry and Commerce of Laos.

He is the son of Samane Vignaket.

References

Members of the 8th Central Committee of the Lao People's Revolutionary Party
Members of the 9th Central Committee of the Lao People's Revolutionary Party
Members of the 10th Central Committee of the Lao People's Revolutionary Party
Lao People's Revolutionary Party politicians
Government ministers of Laos
Living people
Year of birth missing (living people)